General Ulpiano Paez Airport  is a public/military joint-use airport serving the coastal city of Salinas, in the Santa Elena Province of Ecuador. The city and airport are on a peninsula extending into the Pacific Ocean.

The Salinas non-directional beacon (Ident: SLS) and VOR-DME (Ident: SAV) are located on the field.

History
During World War II the airport was used by the United States Army Air Forces Sixth Air Force defending the South American coastline and the Panama Canal against Japanese submarines.  Flying units assigned to the airfield were:
 25th Bombardment Squadron (Panama Canal Department), 21 January 1942 – 22 May 1943, (B-24 Liberator)
 3d Bombardment Squadron (6th Bombardment Group), 23 May-11 June 1943, (B-17 Flying Fortress)
 51st Fighter Squadron (32d Fighter Group) December 1942-March 1943 (P-40 Warhawk)

See also
Transport in Ecuador
List of airports in Ecuador

References

External links
OpenStreetMap - Salinas
OurAirports - Salinas
SkyVector - Salinas
FallingRain - Salinas Airport

Airports in Ecuador
Airfields of the United States Army Air Forces
Buildings and structures in Santa Elena Province